This is a list of prime ministers of India by previous experience. Offices assumed after assuming the role of Prime Minister

Analysis 
Five Indian prime ministers have been active participants in the Indian Independence Movement.

None of the Indian prime ministers have served in the Indian Armed Forces. This is unlike many other state leaders.

List

References 

Prime Ministers of India
India
Lists relating to prime ministers of India